= National Craft Butchers =

The National Federation of Meat & Food Traders
- Formerly: The National Federation of Meat Traders (1900-1994)
- Type: Private company limited by guarantee
- Industry: Butchery
- Founded: 1888(118 years ago)
- Headquarters: Kent, United Kingdom
- Key people: John Mettrick - National President
- Number of employees: 5
- Website: http://www.nfmft.co.uk/

National Craft Butchers, is an organisation based in Tunbridge Wells. Founded as The National Federation of Meat Traders, from 1994 to July 2018 it was known as the National Federation of Meat and Food Traders. It acts to advise members of the organisation in meat and food trades, primarily butcher businesses. Membership provides numerous benefits, including: access to exclusive discounts, advice in training future employees, and maintaining good food hygiene and safety standards.

== Organisational structure ==
Unlike trade unions, this organisation does not engage in collective bargaining with employers, it represents its members' interests to the UK Government and gives members advice and discounts to further their businesses.
